Aluminium oxide (or Aluminium(III) oxide) is a chemical compound of aluminium and oxygen with the chemical formula . It is the most commonly occurring of several aluminium oxides, and specifically identified as aluminium oxide. It is commonly called alumina and may also be called aloxide, aloxite, or alundum in various forms and applications.  It occurs naturally in its crystalline polymorphic phase α-Al2O3 as the mineral corundum, varieties of which form the precious gemstones ruby and sapphire.  Al2O3 is significant in its use to produce aluminium metal, as an abrasive owing to its hardness, and as a refractory material owing to its high melting point.

Natural occurrence
Corundum is the most common naturally occurring crystalline form of aluminium oxide. Rubies and sapphires are gem-quality forms of corundum, which owe their characteristic colours to trace impurities. Rubies are given their characteristic deep red colour and their laser qualities by traces of chromium. Sapphires come in different colours given by various other impurities, such as iron and titanium. An extremely rare δ form occurs as the mineral deltalumite.

Properties

Al2O3 is an electrical insulator but has a relatively high thermal conductivity for a ceramic material. Aluminium oxide is insoluble in water. In its most commonly occurring crystalline form, called corundum or α-aluminium oxide, its hardness makes it suitable for use as an abrasive and as a component in cutting tools.

Aluminium oxide is responsible for the resistance of metallic aluminium to weathering. Metallic aluminium is very reactive with atmospheric oxygen, and a thin passivation layer of aluminium oxide (4 nm thickness) forms on any exposed aluminium surface  in a matter of hundreds of picoseconds. This layer protects the metal from further oxidation. The thickness and properties of this oxide layer can be enhanced using a process called anodising. A number of alloys, such as aluminium bronzes, exploit this property by including a proportion of aluminium in the alloy to enhance corrosion resistance. The aluminium oxide generated by anodising is typically amorphous, but discharge assisted oxidation processes such as plasma electrolytic oxidation result in a significant proportion of crystalline aluminium oxide in the coating, enhancing its hardness.

Aluminium oxide was taken off the United States Environmental Protection Agency's chemicals lists in 1988. Aluminium oxide is on the EPA's Toxics Release Inventory list if it is a fibrous form.

Amphoteric nature
Aluminium oxide is an amphoteric substance, meaning it can react with both acids and bases, such as hydrofluoric acid and sodium hydroxide, acting as an acid with a base and a base with an acid, neutralising the other and producing a salt.
Al2O3 + 6 HF → 2 AlF3 + 3 H2O
Al2O3 + 2 NaOH + 3 H2O → 2 NaAl(OH)4 (sodium aluminate)

Structure

The most common form of crystalline aluminium oxide is known as corundum, which is the thermodynamically stable form. The oxygen ions form a nearly hexagonal close-packed structure with the aluminium ions filling two-thirds of the octahedral interstices. Each Al3+ center is octahedral. In terms of its crystallography, corundum adopts a trigonal Bravais lattice with a space group of Rc (number 167 in the International Tables). The primitive cell contains two formula units of aluminium oxide.

Aluminium oxide also exists in other metastable phases, including the cubic γ and η phases, the monoclinic θ phase, the hexagonal χ phase, the orthorhombic κ phase and the δ phase that can be tetragonal or orthorhombic. Each has a unique crystal structure and properties.  Cubic γ-Al2O3 has important technical applications. The so-called β-Al2O3 proved to be NaAl11O17.

Molten aluminium oxide near the melting temperature is roughly 2/3 tetrahedral (i.e. 2/3 of the Al are surrounded by 4 oxygen neighbors), and 1/3 5-coordinated, with very little (<5%) octahedral Al-O present. Around 80% of the oxygen atoms are shared among three or more Al-O polyhedra, and the majority of inter-polyhedral connections are corner-sharing, with the remaining 10–20% being edge-sharing. The breakdown of octahedra upon melting is accompanied by a relatively large volume increase (~33%), the density of the liquid close to its melting point is 2.93 g/cm3. The structure of molten alumina is temperature dependent and the fraction of 5- and 6-fold aluminium increases during cooling (and supercooling), at the expense of tetrahedral AlO4 units, approaching the local structural arrangements found in amorphous alumina.

Production

Aluminium hydroxide minerals are the main component of bauxite, the principal ore of aluminium. A mixture of the minerals comprise bauxite ore, including gibbsite (Al(OH)3), boehmite (γ-AlO(OH)), and diaspore (α-AlO(OH)), along with impurities of iron oxides and hydroxides, quartz and clay minerals. Bauxites are found in laterites. Bauxite is typically purified using the Bayer process:

 Al2O3 + H2O + NaOH → NaAl(OH)4
 Al(OH)3 + NaOH → NaAl(OH)4

Except for SiO2, the other components of bauxite do not dissolve in base. Upon filtering the basic mixture, Fe2O3 is removed. When the Bayer liquor is cooled, Al(OH)3 precipitates, leaving the silicates in solution.

 NaAl(OH)4 → NaOH + Al(OH)3

The solid  Al(OH)3 Gibbsite is then calcined (heated to over 1100 °C) to give aluminium oxide:

 2 Al(OH)3 → Al2O3 + 3 H2O

The product aluminium oxide tends to be multi-phase, i.e., consisting of several phases of aluminium oxide rather than solely corundum. The production process can therefore be optimized to produce a tailored product. The type of phases present affects, for example, the solubility and pore structure of the aluminium oxide product which, in turn, affects the cost of aluminium production and pollution control.

Applications
Known as alpha alumina in materials science communities or alundum (in fused form) or aloxite in the mining and ceramic communities aluminium oxide finds wide use. Annual world production of aluminium oxide in 2015 was approximately 115 million tonnes, over 90% of which is used in the manufacture of aluminium metal. The major uses of speciality aluminium oxides are in refractories, ceramics, polishing and abrasive applications. Large tonnages of aluminium hydroxide, from which alumina is derived, are used in the manufacture of zeolites, coating titania pigments, and as a fire retardant/smoke suppressant.

Over 90% of the aluminium oxide, normally termed Smelter Grade Alumina (SGA), produced is consumed for the production of aluminium, usually by the Hall–Héroult process. The remainder, normally called speciality alumina is used in a wide variety of applications which reflect its inertness, temperature resistance and electrical resistance.

Fillers
Being fairly chemically inert and white, aluminium oxide is a favored filler for plastics. Aluminium oxide is a common ingredient in sunscreen and is sometimes also present in cosmetics such as blush, lipstick, and nail polish.

Glass
Many formulations of glass have aluminium oxide as an ingredient. Aluminosilicate glass is a commonly used type of glass that often contains 5% to 10% alumina.

Catalysis
Aluminium oxide catalyses a variety of reactions that are useful industrially. In its largest scale application, aluminium oxide is the catalyst in the Claus process for converting hydrogen sulfide waste gases into elemental sulfur in refineries. It is also useful for dehydration of alcohols to alkenes.

Aluminium oxide serves as a catalyst support for many industrial catalysts, such as those used in hydrodesulfurization and some Ziegler–Natta polymerizations.

Gas purification
Aluminium oxide is widely used to remove water from gas streams.

Abrasive
Aluminium oxide is used for its hardness and strength. Its naturally occurring form, corundum, is a 9 on the Mohs scale of mineral hardness (just below diamond). It is widely used as an abrasive, including as a much less expensive substitute for industrial diamond. Many types of sandpaper use aluminium oxide crystals. In addition, its low heat retention and low specific heat make it widely used in grinding operations, particularly cutoff tools. As the powdery abrasive mineral aloxite, it is a major component, along with silica, of the cue tip "chalk" used in billiards. Aluminium oxide powder is used in some CD/DVD polishing and scratch-repair kits. Its polishing qualities are also behind its use in toothpaste.  It is also used in microdermabrasion, both in the machine process available through dermatologists and estheticians, and as a manual dermal abrasive used according to manufacturer directions.

Paint

Aluminium oxide flakes are used in paint for reflective decorative effects, such as in the automotive or cosmetic industries.

Composite fiber
Aluminium oxide has been used in a few experimental and commercial fiber materials for high-performance applications (e.g., Fiber FP, Nextel 610, Nextel 720).  Alumina nanofibers in particular have become a research field of interest.

Armor
Some body armors utilize alumina ceramic plates, usually in combination with aramid or UHMWPE backing to achieve effectiveness against most rifle threats. Alumina ceramic armor is readily available to most civilians in jurisdictions where it is legal, but is not considered military grade. It is also used to produce bullet-proof alumina glass capable to withstand impact of .50 BMG calibre rounds.

Abrasion protection
Aluminium oxide can be grown as a coating on aluminium by anodizing or by plasma electrolytic oxidation (see the "Properties" above). Both the hardness and abrasion-resistant characteristics of the coating originate from the high strength of aluminium oxide, yet the porous coating layer produced with conventional direct current anodizing procedures is within a 60–70 Rockwell hardness C range which is comparable only to hardened carbon steel alloys, but considerably inferior to the hardness of natural and synthetic corundum. Instead, with plasma electrolytic oxidation, the coating is porous only on the surface oxide layer while the lower oxide layers are much more compact than with standard DC anodizing procedures and present a higher crystallinity due to the oxide layers being remelted and densified to obtain α-Al2O3 clusters with much higher coating hardness values circa 2000 Vickers hardness.

Alumina is used to manufacture tiles which are attached inside pulverized fuel lines and flue gas ducting on coal fired power stations to protect high wear areas. They are not suitable for areas with high impact forces as these tiles are brittle and susceptible to breakage.

Electrical insulation
Aluminium oxide is an electrical insulator used as a substrate (silicon on sapphire) for integrated circuits but also as a tunnel barrier for the fabrication of superconducting devices such as single-electron transistors and superconducting quantum interference devices (SQUIDs).

For its application as an electrical insulator in integrated circuits, where the conformal growth of a thin film is a prerequisite and the preferred growth mode is atomic layer deposition, Al2O3 films can be prepared by the chemical exchange between trimethylaluminum (Al(CH3)3) and H2O:

2 Al(CH3)3 + 3 H2O → Al2O3 + 6 CH4

H2O in the above reaction can be replaced by ozone (O3) as the active oxidant and the following reaction then takes place:

2 Al(CH3)3 + O3 → Al2O3 + 3 C2H6

The Al2O3 films prepared using O3 show 10–100 times lower leakage current density compared with those prepared by H2O.

Aluminium oxide, being a dielectric with relatively large band gap, is used as an insulating barrier in capacitors.

Other
In lighting, translucent aluminium oxide is used in some sodium vapor lamps. Aluminium oxide is also used in preparation of coating suspensions in compact fluorescent lamps.

In chemistry laboratories, aluminium oxide is a medium for chromatography, available in basic (pH 9.5), acidic (pH 4.5 when in water) and neutral formulations.

Health and medical applications include it as a material in hip replacements and birth control pills.

It is used as a scintillator 
and dosimeter for radiation protection and therapy applications for its optically stimulated luminescence properties.

Insulation for high-temperature furnaces is often manufactured from aluminium oxide.  Sometimes the insulation has varying percentages of silica depending on the temperature rating of the material.  The insulation can be made in blanket, board, brick and loose fiber forms for various application requirements.

Small pieces of aluminium oxide are often used as boiling chips in chemistry.

It is also used to make spark plug insulators.

Using a plasma spray process and mixed with titania, it is coated onto the braking surface of some bicycle rims to provide abrasion and wear resistance.
 
Most ceramic eyes on fishing rods are circular rings made from aluminium oxide.

In its finest powdered (white) form, called Diamantine, aluminium oxide is used as a superior polishing abrasive in watchmaking and clockmaking.

Aluminium oxide is also used in the coating of stanchions in the motorcross and mountainbike industry. 
This coating is combined with molybdenumdisulfate to provide long term lubrication of the surface.

See also
 Aluminium oxide nanoparticle
 Bauxite tailings
 Beta-alumina solid electrolyte, a fast ion conductor
 Charged Aerosol Release Experiment (CARE)
 List of alumina refineries
 Micro-Pulling-Down
 Transparent alumina

References

External links

 CDC - NIOSH Pocket Guide to Chemical Hazards

Acid catalysts
Abrasives
Aluminium compounds
Amphoteric compounds
Biomaterials
Oxides
Refractory materials
Sesquioxides